The Serbian First Football League (Serbian: Prva liga Srbije) is the second-highest football league in Serbia. The league is operated by the Serbian FA. 18 teams will compete in this league for the 2009-10 season. Two teams will be promoted to the Serbian Superliga and four will be relegated to the Serbian League, the third-highest division overall in the Serbian football league system.

League table

See also
 List of football clubs in Serbia
 Serbian First League
 Serbian League

Serbian First League seasons
2009–10 in Serbian football leagues
Serbia